Ivan Sivoplyasov (born 2 March 1931) is a Soviet athlete. He competed in the men's javelin throw at the 1960 Summer Olympics.

References

External links
  

1931 births
Possibly living people
Athletes (track and field) at the 1960 Summer Olympics
Soviet male javelin throwers
Olympic athletes of the Soviet Union
Sportspeople from Novosibirsk